Heather Collins (born July 22, 1946) is a Canadian children's book illustrator.

She was born in Montreal, Quebec and studied at the Ontario College of Art. She now lives in Toronto.

She illustrated A Pioneer Story: The Daily Life of a Canadian Family in 1840 (1994) with text by Barbara Greenwood. The book received the Ruth and Sylvia Schwartz Children's Book Award, the Information Book Award from the Children's Literature Roundtables of Canada and a Mr. Christie's Book Award.

Selected work 
Books illustrated include:
 Holiday in the Woods (1976) text by Anne Francis (pen name of Florence Bird)
 Fair Play (1982) text by Paul Kropp
 Woosh! I Hear a Sound (1985) text by Emily Hearn
 The Wimp (1985) text by John Ibbitson
 This Little Piggy (1987) text by Heather Collins
 Hiding (1993) text by Dorothy Aldis
 The Kids Canadian Plant Book (1996) text by Pamela Hickman

References 

1946 births
Anglophone Quebec people
Artists from Montreal
Canadian children's book illustrators
Living people